Martina Hingis and Anna Kournikova were the defending champions, but competed this year with different partners. Hingis partnered with Mary Pierce and finished the tournament as runners-up, while Kournikova teamed up with Barbara Schett and lost in semifinals to Lisa Raymond and Rennae Stubbs.

Raymond and Stubbs won the title, defeating Hingis and Pierce 6–4, 5–7, 6–4 in the final. It was the 1st Grand Slam doubles title and 15th title overall for Raymond, and the 1st Grand Slam doubles title and 21st title overall for Stubbs, in their respective careers.

Seeds

Draw

Finals

Top half

Section 1

Section 2

Bottom half

Section 3

Section 4

External links
 2000 Australian Open – Women's draws and results at the International Tennis Federation
 Official Results Archive (Australian Open)

Women's Doubles
Australian Open (tennis) by year – Women's doubles
2000 in Australian women's sport